Mordechai Lightstone (born 1984) is a Chabad rabbi who directs social media for Chabad.org and is the founder of Tech Tribe.

Biography
Lightstone was an early social media adopter, helping to start the Chabad-Lubavitch presence on Twitter in 2008, and later Snapchat. Lightstone has been described as "Twitter’s most prominent rabbi", regularly tweeting from his personal account in addition to the account he manages for Chabad.

Tech Tribe 
Lightstone directs Tech Tribe, along with his wife Chana. It is an organization for Jewish people in technology and hosts events such as the #openShabbat Friday night dinner at SXSW and Comic-Con. In 2021 they launched a project to create an NFT Torah.

Appearances and recognition
Lightstone was a 2018 TED resident speaking about bringing "centuries-old wisdom to modern-day social media".

In April 2020, Lightstone was featured in the Saturday Night Seder alongside other Jewish personalities.

In June 2021, Lightstone was awarded a Rockower Award for his column on Al Jaffee.

In July 2021, Lightstone was named as one of The Jewish Week's 36 under 36.

Personal life
Lightstone lives with his wife Chana in Brooklyn, New York. Together they have seven children.

References

21st-century American rabbis
Chabad-Lubavitch rabbis
Living people
Orthodox rabbis from New York City
People from Crown Heights, Brooklyn
1984 births